The UBS Cup was a team golf tournament contested by the United States and a team representing the "Rest of the World" which ran from 2001 to 2004. In 2001 and 2002 it was called the UBS Warburg Cup. Six golfers on each side had to be 50 or over, and the remaining six had to be in their forties. It was sanctioned by the PGA Tour (which operates the Champions Tour for golfers over 50) and the European Seniors Tour. Like the Ryder Cup, the competition was a mixture of foursomes matches, four ball matches and single matches.

The United States won the inaugural cup in 2001, held at Cassique Golf Course Kiawah Island, by a score of 12 ½ - 11 ½. The U.S. then retained the trophy with a 14 ½ - 9 ½ victory in 2002 on the Seaside Course at Sea Island, Georgia. A 12-12 draw in 2003, again at Sea Island, kept the trophy in the hands of the U.S. defenders.  A 14-10 U.S. victory at Kiawah Island in 2004 was the final competition, when Colin Montgomerie lost to an American for the first time in matchplay singles.

In 2004 the UBS Cup had a prize fund of $3 million, with $150,000 going to each member of the winning team and $100,000 to each member of the losing team. Arnold Palmer was captain of the United States team in all four UBS Cups, and retained his record of never having lost any team competition as United States captain.

Results

Appearances
The following are those who played in at least one of the four matches.

United States
 Paul Azinger 2002
 Mark Calcavecchia 2001
 John Cook 2001
 Fred Couples 2004
 Brad Faxon 2003
 Raymond Floyd 2001, 2002, 2003, 2004
 Fred Funk 2002, 2004
 Bob Gilder 2002
 Jay Haas 2004
 Scott Hoch 2001, 2002, 2003, 2004
 Hale Irwin 2001, 2002, 2003, 2004
 Tom Kite 2002, 2004
 Tom Lehman 2002
 Bruce Lietzke 2003
 Rocco Mediate 2003
 Larry Nelson 2001
 Mark O'Meara 2001, 2002, 2003
 Arnold Palmer 2001, 2002, 2003, 2004
 Dana Quigley 2001
 Loren Roberts 2001
 Craig Stadler 2003, 2004
 Curtis Strange 2001, 2002, 2003, 2004
 Hal Sutton 2003, 2004

Rest of the World
  Isao Aoki 2001, 2002
  José María Cañizares 2001
  John Chillas 2004
  Rodger Davis 2002, 2003, 2004
  Denis Durnian 2001, 2002
  Seiji Ebihara 2002
  Nick Faldo 2001, 2002, 2003
  Vicente Fernández 2003
  Stewart Ginn 2001, 2002
  Tony Jacklin 2003
  Barry Lane 2002, 2003, 2004
  Bernhard Langer 2001, 2002, 2003, 2004
  Bill Longmuir 2003
  Sandy Lyle 2004
  Carl Mason 2003, 2004
  Mark McNulty 2004
  Colin Montgomerie 2003, 2004
  Frank Nobilo 2001
  Gary Player 2001, 2002, 2004
  Eduardo Romero 2002, 2003
  Peter Senior 2004
  Des Smyth 2001, 2003
  Ian Stanley 2001
  Sam Torrance 2001, 2002, 2004
  Ian Woosnam 2001, 2002, 2003, 2004

References

External links
Coverage on the European Senior Tour's official site (2001)
Coverage on the European Senior Tour's official site (2002)
Coverage on the European Senior Tour's official site (2003)
Coverage on the European Senior Tour's official site (2004)

Team golf tournaments
Golf tournaments in the United States
Senior golf tournaments
UBS